Sjøstrand is a village in Nesodden, Viken county, Norway.

Villages in Akershus